The Computer Oracle and Password System (COPS) was the first vulnerability scanner for Unix operating systems to achieve widespread use. It was created by Dan Farmer while he was a student at Purdue University. Gene Spafford helped Farmer start the project in 1989.

Features
COPS is a software suite comprising at least 12 small vulnerability scanners, each programmed to audit one part of the operating system:

 File permissions, including device permissions/nodes
 Password strength
 Content, format, and security of password and group files (e.g., passwd)
 Programs and files run in /etc/rc* and cron(tab) files
 Root-SUID files: Which users can modify them? Are they shell scripts?
 A cyclic redundancy check of important files
 Writability of users' home directories and startup files
 Anonymous FTP configuration
 Unrestricted TFTP, decode alias in sendmail, SUID uudecode problems, hidden shells inside inetd.conf, rexd in inetd.conf
 Various root checks: Is the current directory in the search path? Is there a plus sign ("+") in the /etc/host.equiv file? Are NFS mounts unrestricted? Is root in /etc/ftpusers?
 Compare the modification dates of crucial files with dates of advisories from the CERT Coordination Center
 Kuang expert system

After COPS, Farmer developed another vulnerability scanner called SATAN (Security Administrator Tool for Analyzing Networks).

COPS is generally considered obsolete, but it is not uncommon to find systems which are set up in an insecure manner that COPS will identify.

References

External links
COPS
Citeseer entry for the COPS Usenix paper

1989 software
Linux security software
Unix security-related software